Ceutorhynchus is a genus of true weevils in the tribe Ceutorhynchini.  There are at least 400 described species in Ceutorhynchus.

Ceutorhynchus succinus Legalov, 2013 is a species from the Eocene of Europe found in Baltic amber.

See also
 List of Ceutorhynchus species

References

External links
 
 
 
 Ceutorhynchus at insectoid.info

Ceutorhynchini
Baridinae genera
Curculionidae
Taxa described in 1824